The men's road race C4-5 cycling event at the 2016 Summer Paralympics took place on September 17 at Pontal, Rio. The race distance was 60 km.

Results : Men's road race C4-5

References

Men's road race C4-5